Colville Lake Water Aerodrome  is located just west of Colville Lake, Northwest Territories, Canada. It may be used for ski equipped aircraft in the winter months.

See also
Colville Lake/Tommy Kochon Aerodrome

References

Airports in the Arctic
Registered aerodromes in the Sahtu Region
Seaplane bases in the Northwest Territories